Suzana Al-Salkini (born 1984) is a Macedonian beauty pageant titleholder.  She won the right to represent her country in Miss World 2008 in Johannesburg, South Africa, on 13 December 2008, but due to financial issues and the lack of sponsorship, she was not allowed to travel to South Africa to compete for the crown. Instead, she was given the opportunity to compete in Miss World 2009, also in Johannesburg, South Africa on 12 December 2009.

References 

1984 births
Living people
Macedonian female models
Miss World 2009 delegates
People from Skopje
Macedonian beauty pageant winners